Warman is the ninth largest city in Saskatchewan, Canada. According to the 2016 census, Warman is the fastest growing municipality in the country, growing 55% between 2011 and 2016. Warman is a bedroom community of Saskatoon. The current mayor is Gary Philipchuk.

Warman is the newest city in Saskatchewan, officially incorporated on October 27, 2012. Warman is surrounded by the Rural Municipality of Corman Park No. 344.

History

The community of Warman was born when the Canadian Northern Railway (now part of the Canadian National Railway) running from Humboldt to North Battleford intersected with the Canadian Pacific Railway running from Regina to Prince Albert. This took place in the fall of 1904.  The Warman railway station was in operation from 1907 until 1942 when it was moved to its current location; the building now serves as a Seniors Drop-in centre.

In 1910, A fire destroyed much of the town, including most of Main Street, which contained much of Warman's businesses and the pool house, reducing Warman's population. For this reason, Main Street became a residential side street as Warman's businesses opted to rebuild along Central Street instead.

The original name of the town was Diamond, because the crossing of the two railroad lines created a diamond shape. Soon the name of the town site was changed to Warman, named after Cy Warman (1855–1914), a journalist who followed and recorded the construction of the Canadian Northern Railway. In 1905, there was a huge influx of settlers so that in 1906, Warman was organized as a village. By 1927, the population had dropped to 148 people so that the village council decided to disorganize and return to hamlet status. For the next 35 years the affairs of the hamlet were handled by the Rural Municipality of Warman, who had their office in Warman.

In the early 1950s Warman began to grow again. By 1961, the population of Warman had reached 659, so it was decided in 1962 to incorporate again as a village. It was incorporated as a town four years later. By 2011, the town grew to a population of 7084. The town council applied for city status in 2012 and it was approved by the provincial government in the summer of that year. Warman officially became a city on October 27, 2012.

Former NHL hockey player Ed Dyck was born in Warman.

Demographics 

Education

In Spring 2014, Catholic residents in Warman formed a local Catholic school division which amalgamated with Greater Saskatoon Catholic Schools shortly thereafter. It was revealed on June 23, 2015 that the division's new elementary school in Warman will be named Holy Trinity Catholic School and was completed in 2017.

See also
List of communities in Saskatchewan

References

Further reading

Works by Cy Warman
 Tales of an Engineer: With Rhymes of the Rail (1895)
 Frontier Stories (1898)
 Snow on the Headlight: The Story of the Great Burlington Strike (1899)
 The Story of the Railroad (1906)
 The Express Messenger and Other Stories of the Rail (1908)
 The Songs of Cy Warman (1911).

External links

Cities in Saskatchewan
Division No. 11, Saskatchewan